Jackie Dunbar is a Scottish National Party (SNP) politician.  She has served as the Member of the Scottish Parliament (MSP) for Aberdeen Donside since May 2021.

Dunbar was born in Peterhead and educated in Elgin.  She was elected to the Northfield (later Northfield/Mastrick North) ward of Aberdeen City Council in 2007, and held some senior posts on the council. She has remained a councillor since first taking up the post. In 2021, Dunbar was elected as a MSP for Aberdeen Donside, following her predecessor Mark McDonald's decision to not seek re-election. While serving as a MSP, Dunbar has pledged to donate her council salary to charity.

References

External links 
 

Year of birth missing (living people)
Living people
Scottish National Party MSPs
Politicians from Aberdeen
People from Peterhead
Members of the Scottish Parliament 2021–2026
Scottish National Party councillors
Female members of the Scottish Parliament
Councillors in Aberdeen
Women councillors in Scotland